A vehicle lane is a part of a road designated for use by a single line of traffic.

Lane may also refer to:

Roadways
 Avenue (landscape) a road with trees
 Country lane
 Back lane

Places

United Kingdom
Lane, Cornwall
Lane, West Yorkshire
The Lanes, an area of narrow streets and alleyways in Brighton

United States
Lane, Idaho
Lane, Illinois
Lane, Kansas
Lane, Nebraska
Lane, Oklahoma
Lane, South Carolina
Lane, South Dakota
Lane City, Texas
Lane County, Kansas
Lane County, Oregon

Other countries
Lanë, a stream in Tirana, Albania
Lane, Belgium, Dutch name of the municipality of Lasne

Elsewhere
Lane (crater), an impact crater on the far side of the Moon

People and fictional characters
 Lane (surname)
 Lane (given name)

Education
Lane College, Tennessee
Lane Theological Seminary, Ohio

Sports
Lane or alley, in the game of bowling
Lane or key, also known as the free throw lane, on a basketball court

Other uses
Lane (hash function), a cryptographic hash function
Hurricane Lane, several storms
Lane cake, also known as prize cake or Alabama Lane cake, a bourbon-laced baked cake
Lane, a single serial communication connection within a computer interface link (e.g., Ethernet, PCI Express)
"The Lane", a 1996 single by Ice-T
The Lane Hotel, a historic building in Mathews, Virginia, US
One of three paths (top, bottom, and middle) in many Multiplayer Online Battle Arena video games

See also
Lain (disambiguation)
Laine (disambiguation)
Layne, a surname and given name